The canton of Le Catelet is a former administrative division in northern France. It was disbanded following the French canton reorganisation which came into effect in March 2015. It consisted of 18 communes, which joined the canton of Bohain-en-Vermandois in 2015. It had 8,537 inhabitants (2012).

The canton comprised the following communes:

Aubencheul-aux-Bois
Beaurevoir
Bellenglise
Bellicourt
Bony
Le Catelet
Estrées
Gouy
Hargicourt
Joncourt
Lehaucourt
Lempire
Levergies
Magny-la-Fosse
Nauroy
Sequehart
Vendhuile
Villeret

See also
List of cantons of France

References

Catelet
2015 disestablishments in France
States and territories disestablished in 2015